Georgios Parris (born 27 December 1950) is a Greek hurdler. He competed in the men's 400 metres hurdles at the 1976 Summer Olympics.

References

1950 births
Living people
Athletes (track and field) at the 1976 Summer Olympics
Greek male hurdlers
Olympic athletes of Greece
Place of birth missing (living people)
Mediterranean Games silver medalists for Greece
Mediterranean Games medalists in athletics
Athletes (track and field) at the 1975 Mediterranean Games
Sportspeople from the South Aegean
People from Syros